The K53/54 Beijing-Shenyang Through Train is a train service running between Beijing and Shenyang, the capital of Liaoning province. It is operated by China Railway Shenyang Group using 25G sleeper carriages. The 727 km journey takes the train on the Beijing-Harbin Railway, Tianjin-Shanhaiguan Railway and Shenyang-Shanhaiguan Railway. The train from Beijing to Shenyang is numbered K53, with a journey time of around 9 hours, while the train in the opposite direction is numbered K54, with a journey time of about 9 hours and 30 minutes.

History 
The train has been in operation since 1954, when it was operated by the then Beijing Railway Bureau. Operation was then handed over to Shenyang Railway Bureau in 1966. In 1991, the train was renumbered 53/54 and received an upgrade to air-conditioned 25G sleeper carriages, after which there were no more major amendments till today.

Due to the overnight nature of the train, its demand was largely unaffected by the launch of EMU trains between Beijing and Shenyang, and it remains a popular choice of travellers.

Formation
The train currently utilises 25G carriages, with a formation consisting of mostly hard sleeper carriages. The train is also the first in China to only have sleeper carriages in its formation.

Locomotives
The train utilises the SS9 electric locomotive for the entire journey. As the carriages have a power supply mode of DC600V, the locomotive is able to supply electricity directly to the carriages as well.

Timetable

See also 
D51/52 Beijing-Shenyang Through Train
Beijing-Shenyang Through Train
G217/218 Beijing-Shenyang Through Train
G219/220 Beijing-Shenyang Through Train

References 

Passenger rail transport in China
Rail transport in Beijing
Rail transport in Liaoning